Nikolay Madoyan (also spelled Nikolai Madojan, ; born 1 June 1973 in Yerevan) is an Armenian virtuoso violinist. Madoyan's continuous performance of 59 world classics of different styles and epochs, for more than 33 hours, has been entered in the Guinness World Records book as an “Officially Amazing” achievement.

He studied with Hrachya Bogdanyan, Zakhar Bron, Miriam Solovieff and Isaac Stern.
and has been awarded the title of the Merited Artist of Armenia for supreme mastery and excellence in the promotion of arts.

Early life and education
Nikolay Madoyan was admitted to the Tchaikovsky Music School in Yerevan, where he studied under the patronage of professor Hrachya Bogdanyan. Impressed by the 13-year-old talent, Russian violin professor Zakhar Bron invited Madoyan to continue his studies at the Novosibirsk Glinka Conservatory. In the following years Madoyan won the 1st Prize at the All-Russian Competition for Young Violinists and became the laureate and the winner of the Special Jury Prize at the International H. Wieniawski and K. Lipinski Competition for Young Violinists in Poland.

Together with Prof. Bron's wunderkind class, at the invitation of the Lübeck Music Academy, Madoyan moved to live and study in Germany where he made a debut at the Schleswig-Holstein Music Festival with the Mariinsky Theater Orchestra conducted by Valery Gergiev. Nikolay Madoyan appeared in the “Five Young Russian Top Talents” series along with V. Repin, M. Vengerov, N. Luganski and E. Kissin, playing Beethoven's Violin Concerto at the Concertgebouw Amsterdam and other European venues.

In 1991, Madoyan won the 1st prize at the International Kullenkampf Competition of Violinists in Cologne, Germany. Moreover, he became the laureate at the Tokyo International Competition of Violinists and was awarded the Special Prize for the Best Performer of the Japanese Work.

Madoyan took master classes from violinists Miriam Solovieff and Isaac Stern, with whom he would perform together in France,

Nikolay Madoyan holds Ph.D. degree in Violin Performance from Berlin University of the Arts and was bestowed the title of the “Honorary Professor” at the Yerevan State Conservatory.

Career
After graduating from the Lübeck Academy, Nikolay Madoyan launched a series of concert tours in Germany with the London Mozart Players chamber orchestra conducted by Matthias Bamert. Then he had a concert in the United Kingdom with the Novosibirsk Philharmonic Orchestra, where among other works he played the Tchaikovsky Violin Concerto conducted by Arnold Katz. Madoyan's performances with the Netherlands and Rotterdam Symphonic Orchestras and Cologne Chamber Orchestra were in the highlight of the local media. Madoyan was the founder of the “Madoyan-Westenholz-Denitzen” trio, which successfully toured around Europe, featuring works by Shostakovich, Schubert, Beethoven and Ravel.

A collaboration of Nikolay Madoyan and the pianist Elizabeth Westenholz resulted in CDs, released by Kontrapunkt and Cowbell, featuring violin sonatas by Mendelson, Grieg, Schubert, Prokofiev, Strauss and Franck. In European newspapers and magazines reviews were written about Madoyan's CD records, among them the Gramophone review, which specifically highlighted Madoyan's natural feel for the right inflexion and successful collaboration with the pianist for the releases of Prokofiev's, Grieg's, and Schubert's Violin Sonatas.

Performances 
Madoyan's repertoire includes an extensive range of violin works. He performed all six Paganini's Violin Concertos by memory in one concert.

Nikolay Madoyan has performed with a number of world's best symphony orchestras and conductors such as Helmut Muller-Bruhl, Richard Hickox, Kurt Mazur, Frans Brüggen, Claudio Abbado, Arnold Katz, Dmitri Kitayenko, Valery Gergiev, Leopold Hager, Richard Dufallo, Karen Durgaryan, Kees Bakels, Nikolai Alekseyev, Vasily Sinaisky, Erich Vechter, George A. Albrecht, Janos Furst and many more.

The list of the concert halls he performed at includes Teatro di San Carlo, Tivoli Concert Hall, Concertgebouw Amsterdam, Royal Festival Hall, Verdi Theater in Milan, Berlin Kammermusiksaal, Birmingham Symphony Hall, Edinburgh Queen's Hall, Glasgow Royal Concert Hall, Berliner Philharmonie, Hamburg Musikhalle, Stuttgart Beethoven Hall, Duesseldorf Robert-Schumann-Saal, Vienna Kammermusiksaal, Reims Concert Hall, Concertgebouw Brugge, Belgrade Philharmonia, Tokyo NHK Hall, Beijing Big Concert Hall, Montreal Place des Arts, Zurich Tonhalle, Aram Khachaturian Concert Hall, Kuhmo Concert Hall, Big Concert Hall of Moscow Conservatory and many more.

Prizes and awards

Prizes 

1988 – Laureate and Special Prize winner of Spectators and Journalists at the IV International H. Wieniawski and K. Lipinski Competition of Young Violinists
 1988 – 1st prize in the All Russian Violin Competition (Novosibirsk, Russia)
 1991 – 1st prize in the International Kulenkampf Competition of Violinists (Cologne, Germany)
 1992 – Laureate and Special Prize winner for Best Performer of the Japanese Work at Tokyo International Competition of Violinists (Tokyo, Japan)
 2003 – Boghossian Prize (previously President Prize) For the high performance of 15 violin miniatures of outstanding composers of 17–20 centuries

Awards 
 1995 – Medal of the Coat of Arms of the City of Yerevan
 2004 – Merited Artist of Armenia
 2004 – Gold Medal of the Ministry of Culture, Armenia 
 2017 – Guinness World Record – The Longest Violin Performance, “Officially Amazing” – 33 hours, 2 minutes and 41 seconds, England

Discography 
 1990: Die Meisterschüler von Zakhar Bron. (N. Madoyan, D. Garett, M. Vengerov, V. Repin). Label Ambitus Musikproduktion
 1994:  Sergei Prokofiev: Violin Sonatas / Five Melodies. Label Kontrapunkt
 1995:  Grieg: Violin Sonatas. Label Kontrapunkt
 1997:  Mendelssohn-Bartoldy: Complete Sonatas for Violin and Piano. Label Kontrapunkt
 1998:  Schubert: Works for Violin and Piano. Label Kontrapunkt
 2000:  Cesar Franck: Sonata F Major / Richard Strauss: Sonata E Flat Major. Label Kontrapunkt
 2007:  Favourite Encores. Label CowBell Music

References

External links 
 
 
 Ours: Nikolay Madoyan
 Nikolay Madoyan at Kontrapunkt
 Nikolay Madoyan at Cowbell Music
 Nikolay Madoyan at AllMusic

1973 births
Living people
Musicians from Yerevan
Armenian classical violinists
21st-century classical violinists